A nautical mile is a unit of length used in air, marine, and space navigation, and for the definition of territorial waters. Historically, it was defined as the meridian arc length corresponding to one minute ( of a degree) of latitude. Today the international nautical mile is defined as exactly . The derived unit of speed is the knot, one nautical mile per hour.

Unit symbol 

There is no single internationally agreed symbol, with several symbols in use.
 M is used as the abbreviation for the nautical mile by the International Hydrographic Organization.
 NM is used by the International Civil Aviation Organization.
 nmi is used by the Institute of Electrical and Electronics Engineers and the United States Government Publishing Office.
 nm is a non-standard abbreviation used in many maritime applications and texts, including U.S. Government Coast Pilots and Sailing Directions. It conflicts with the SI symbol for nanometre.

History 

The word mile is from the Latin word for a thousand paces: mille passus. Navigation at sea was done by eye until around 1500 when navigational instruments were developed and cartographers began using a coordinate system with parallels of latitude and meridians of longitude.

By the late 16th century, Englishmen knew that the ratio of distances at sea to degrees was constant along any great circle (such as the equator, or any meridian), assuming that Earth was a sphere. Robert Hues wrote in 1594 that the distance along a great circle was 60 miles per degree, that is, one nautical mile per arcminute. Edmund Gunter wrote in 1623 that the distance along a great circle was 20 leagues per degree. Thus, Hues explicitly used nautical miles while Gunter did not.

Since the Earth is not a perfect sphere but is an oblate spheroid with slightly flattened poles, a minute of latitude is not constant, but about 1,861 metres at the poles and 1,843 metres at the Equator. France and other metric countries state that in principle a nautical mile is an arcminute of a meridian at a latitude of 45°, but that is a modern justification for a more mundane calculation that was developed a century earlier. By the mid-19th century, France had defined a nautical mile via the original 1791 definition of the metre, one ten-millionth of a quarter meridian. Thus  became the metric length for a nautical mile. France made it legal for the French Navy in 1906, and many metric countries voted to sanction it for international use at the 1929 International Hydrographic Conference.

Both the United States and the United Kingdom used an average arcminute, specifically, a minute of arc of a great circle of a sphere having the same surface area as the Clarke 1866 ellipsoid. The United States chose five significant digits for its nautical mile, 6,080.2 feet, whereas the United Kingdom chose four significant digits for its Admiralty mile, 6,080 feet.

In 1929, the international nautical mile was defined by the First International Extraordinary Hydrographic Conference in Monaco as exactly 1,852 metres. The United States did not adopt the international nautical mile until 1954. Britain adopted it in 1970, but legal references to the obsolete unit are now converted to 1,853 metres.

Similar definitions 
The Earth's circumference is therefore approximately 40,000 km. The equatorial circumference is slightly longer than the polar circumference the measurement based on this ( = 1,855.3 metres) is known as the geographical mile.

This is potentially useful for celestial navigation on a human mission to the planet, both as a shorthand and a quick way to roughly determine the location.

See also 

 Conversion of units
 Orders of magnitude (length)

Notes

References 

Mile
Units of length
Customary units of measurement in the United States